Mick McGinley (born 1940/1) is an Irish former Gaelic footballer who played for St Eunan's and the Donegal county team.

McGinley is from Dunfanaghy. He attended St Eunan's College, where he played for the school team and was part of the 1956 MacRory Cup-winning team. He also won a Rannafast Cup with the College in 1956.

McGinley won an Ulster Minor Football Championship with Donegal in 1956. He played for the Donegal county football team at a senior level between 1959 and 1961. At this time he joined the British Merchant Navy.

McGinley introduced Dermot Desmond and Jim McGuinness to each other.

McGinley has played in amateur golf tournaments in Ireland, Spain and Portugal. Married to Julia from Rathmullan, the couple live in Rathfarnham and McGinley worked in telecommunications. Sigma Wireless is the name of his telecommunications company. Their son, Paul, is a professional golfer. The couple also have a daughter who is a midwife.

One day, after having often experienced pains in his chest, he had a minor heart attack on the golf course.

References

1940s births
Living people
British Merchant Navy personnel
Donegal inter-county Gaelic footballers
People educated at St Eunan's College